Francis Aurelio deSouza (born December 2, 1970) is an American entrepreneur and business executive. He is the president and chief executive officer (CEO) of Illumina and a member of the Board of Directors of The Walt Disney Company.

Before Illumina, deSouza was president of products and services at Symantec. He joined Symantec in 2006 when Symantec acquired IMlogic, where deSouza was founder and CEO. Prior to IMlogic, deSouza worked at Microsoft from 1998 to 2001 after Microsoft acquired Flash Communications, where deSouza was co-founder and CEO.

Early life 
He was born in Addis Ababa, Ethiopia, to Elpinki, an Ethiopian/Greek mother, and Domingos, an Indian father. He was the second of five children. His mother was a homemaker and his father was a commercial representative for Japanese trading company Itochu. Before he was 5, his family moved to Dubai, United Arab Emirates.

In 1987, at age 16, he graduated from St. Mary's Catholic High School, Dubai, UAE and was admitted to the Massachusetts Institute of Technology (MIT). He graduated Tau Beta Pi, Eta Kappa Nu and Sigma Xi from MIT in 1992 with Master of Science and Bachelor of Science degrees in electrical engineering and computer science and a minor in economics.

Personal life 
During the divorce proceedings of Mr. deSouza and his wife Erica, the division of their crypto assets became a subject of dispute, drawing attention to how Cryptocurrency assets are treated in cases of divorce.

Career 
Early in his career, he worked at the IBM Thomas J. Watson Research Center and then in management consulting. DeSouza co-founded and served as CEO of Flash Communications, a provider of corporate instant messaging that was acquired by Microsoft in 1998.

Microsoft 
Following Microsoft's acquisition of Flash, deSouza joined Microsoft and became a product unit manager, where he led the team responsible for the development of the company's enterprise real-time collaboration offerings, including instant messaging, chat, voice over IP and NetMeeting.

IMlogic 
DeSouza left Microsoft in 2001 and founded IMlogic, where he served as CEO and grew the company into the market leading provider of instant messaging security.

Symantec 
DeSouza joined Symantec through the company's acquisition of IMlogic in February 2006. DeSouza served as president of products and services at Symantec until November 11, 2013. He led the research, product management, engineering, customer support and operations for Symantec's offerings, which generated $6.73 billion in revenue in FY11.

Illumina 
DeSouza became president and chief executive officer of Illumina on July 5, 2016, and has served on Illumina's board of directors since November 2013. Prior to becoming president and CEO in July 2016, he served as President of Illumina from November 2013 to July 2016. He was responsible for Illumina's business units and for developing, marketing, selling and supporting the company's products. DeSouza joined Illumina in November 2013.

Board member 
He served on the Board of Directors of Citrix Systems from December 2014 to June 2016.

In February 2018 deSouza was elected to the Board of Directors of The Walt Disney Company.

Accolades and recognition 

 Top CEOs 2019 on Glassdoor
 Top CEOs 2018 on Glassdoor
 Top Businesspersons of the Year #10 on Fortune global list of (2018)
 40 under 40 - Silicon Valley Business Journal (2007)

References

External links 
 Executive Profile at Illumina
 
 

1970 births
Living people
American technology company founders
American technology chief executives
Directors of The Walt Disney Company
American business executives
American chief executives of manufacturing companies
American computer businesspeople
American management consultants
MIT School of Engineering alumni
American people of Greek descent
American people of Indian descent
American health activists
American corporate directors
Businesspeople in information technology
Businesspeople in software
Gen Digital people
Businesspeople from the San Francisco Bay Area